Church End is a hamlet in the East Riding of Yorkshire, England.

It forms part of the civil parish of North Frodingham.

The Grade II* listed church of St Elgin was restored in stages between 1877 and 1891 by Sir Tatton Sykes, 5th Baronet with the top part of the Perpendicular tower being designed by Temple Moor in 1892. It is on the Sykes Churches Trail devised by the East Yorkshire Churches Group.

References

Villages in the East Riding of Yorkshire